The 2013 Games of the Small States of Europe, also known as the XV Games of the Small States of Europe, were held in Luxembourg City and surrounding areas.

Athletics

Men

Women

Basketball

Cycling

Men

Women

Gymnastics

Men

Women

Judo

Men

Women

Shooting

Men

Women

Swimming

Men

Women

Table Tennis

Men

Women

Tennis

Volleyball

Indoor

Beach

References

External links
Site of the 2013 Games of the Small States of Europe 

Medalists
Small States of Europe 2013
Small States of Europe 2013